"It's a New Day" is a song produced and organised by rapper and producer will.i.am. It was released as promotional single on November 7, 2008 from political compilation album Change Is Now: Renewing America's Promise,. Will performed the song for the first time on The Oprah Winfrey Show. The song was written as a tribute to President Barack Obama's victory. It was used in an episode of the second season of Gossip Girl. A parody of the song was featured on the Boondocks episode "It's a Black President, Huey Freeman." It was titled "Dick Riding Obama", and featured will.i.am, rapper Thugnificent, Gangstalicious and a George Clooney lookalike debating whether Obama's victory was really a success. A scene from the episode was released on YouTube before the episode aired as a form of viral marketing.

Music video
The song's music video was released in November 2008, and features cameos by various celebrities, including:

 Olivia Wilde 
 Kevin Bacon
 Kyra Sedgwick
 Taboo 
 Fergie 
 apl.de.ap
 Kanye West
 Kerry Washington
 Gayle King
 Brian J. White
 Quincy Jones
 Aisha Tyler
 Harold Perrineau, Jr.
 Joe Biden
 Barack Obama
 Jesse Jackson

Charts

References

Songs about Barack Obama
2008 singles
Will.i.am songs
Songs written by will.i.am
Song recordings produced by will.i.am
2008 songs
Interscope Records singles